The Bahamas has a strong bilateral relationship with the United Kingdom, represented by a High Commissioner in London. The Bahamas also associates closely with other nations of the Caribbean Community (CARICOM).

The Bahamas became a member of the Organization of American States (OAS) in 1956 and the United Nations (UN) in 1973.

The Bahamas and the Commonwealth of Nations
The Bahamas has been an independent Commonwealth realm since 1973, with Charles III as King of The Bahamas. The King is represented locally by the Governor-General of the Bahamas.

Bilateral relations 
List of countries which The Bahamas maintains diplomatic relations with:

Multilateral memberships 
The Bahamas holds memberships in a number of international organizations: the UN and some specialized and related agencies, including the Food and Agriculture Organization (FAO), International Civil Aviation Organization (ICAO), International Labour Organization (ILO), International Monetary Fund (IMF), International Telecommunication Union (ITU), World Bank, World Meteorological Organization (WMO), and World Health Organization (WHO); the OAS and related agencies, including the Inter-American Development Bank (IDB), Caribbean Development Bank (CDB), and Pan-American Health Organization (PAHO); the Caribbean Community (CARICOM), excluding its Caribbean Single Market and Economy; the International Criminal Police Organization - Interpol; the Universal Postal Union (UPU); the International Maritime Organization (IMO); and the World Intellectual Property Organization (WIPO).

See also
 List of diplomatic missions in the Bahamas
 List of diplomatic missions of the Bahamas
 Visa requirements for Bahamian citizens
 North American Union
 North American Free Trade Agreement
 Free Trade Area of the Americas
 Third Border Initiative
 Caribbean Basin Initiative (CBI)
 Caribbean Basin Trade Partnership Act
 Western Hemisphere Travel Initiative

References

 
 
 Establishment of diplomatic missions between the Bahamas and Russia

United States
The United States Department of State – The Bahamas
The Embassy of the United States of America
The Bahamas-Sub Office of the U.S. Federal Bureau of Investigation

External links
 History of Bahamas–U.S. relations

 
Bahamas and the Commonwealth of Nations